Doctor Who: Worlds Apart is a free-to-play digital collectible card game using a blockchain on a fork of Ethereum developed and published by Reality Gaming Group, based upon the BBC television series Doctor Who. The game is set for release for Microsoft Windows, macOS and mobile devices.

Gameplay
Players control a Time Lord, one of the races from the series, and need to challenge opponents with card decks which they build.

Card sets
Cards for the game operate on Reality Gaming Group's Digital Asset Trading (DAT) Platform. Each card is minted as an NFT on a "sidechain" and can be traded and sold on marketplaces. Prior to the game's release, cards were available to collect starting from October 2020.

A Time Lord Victorious set consisting of 50 cards was released on August 26, 2021 featuring two different packs, the core and premium packs, with the former available with unlimited supply and the latter featuring a unique card frame and limited to 10,000 packs.

Development
The game was first announced in August 2020 as a partnership between BBC Studios and Reality Gaming Group to create a digital trading card game based on the Doctor Who IP using blockchain technology. This would allow each collectible to be to be secured and protected by tokenising as non-fungible tokens (NFTs).

Reality's co-founder Tony Pearce had said that understanding "what an NFT is" had proved difficult for Doctor Who fans at the start. Together with the BBC, they hoped to "educate the younger Doctor Who fans of why there is value and utility with these cards."

On December 15, 2021, the game's early access was launched and only accessible to players who held a Founders Token.

References

External links

Official website

Blockchain games
Digital collectible card games
Ethereum
MacOS games
Non-fungible token
Upcoming video games
Worlds Apart
Video games developed in the United Kingdom
Windows games